James Costos (born 1963)  is an American diplomat who was the United States Ambassador to Spain and Andorra from 2013 to 2017. He was appointed by President Barack Obama and confirmed by the United States Senate on August 1, 2013. 

Outside of his diplomatic work, Costos served as a former executive for HBO, and is the current president of film production company Secuoya Studios. He has also been appointed as a member of the board of directors for the Spanish pharmaceutical company Grifols in October 2020, and the American LGBTQ advocacy group, Human Rights Campaign, in October 2021.

Early life and education
Costos was born in 1963 and grew up in Lowell, Massachusetts. He is a second-generation Greek-American, whose father served as a U.S. Marine and was stationed at Camp David during the Truman administration. He is the first in his family to graduate college. He earned a degree in political science from the University of Massachusetts Lowell in 1985.

Career
Ambassador Costos was a corporate leader and executive in the international retail and international entertainment industries, most notably at HBO and Tod's. He is an active supporter of humanitarian organizations, including the Human Rights Campaign and the Santa Monica Museum of Art, and an advocate for cultural institutions and cultural diplomacy. He has served on the board of directors of the Humane Society of the United States, the country's largest animal protection organization.

President Obama nominated Costos for the position of U.S. Ambassador to Spain and Principality of Andorra on June 14, 2013. The U.S. Senate voted to confirm the nomination on August 1, 2013, and Costos was sworn in on August 22, 2013. He presented his credentials to the Spanish government in Madrid on September 24, 2013. He presented his credentials to the Co-Princes of Andorra in La Seu d'Urgell on April 4, 2014, and in Paris on July 23, 2014.

His business career has made him expert on the issue of the enforcement of laws against digital piracy, a particular concern of U.S. businesses with respect to Spain. His initial focus, he said, was on issues of international security and thanking Spain for allowing the U.S. to deploy part of its anti-missile shield defense and for hosting U.S. military bases. In September 2013, Costos visited the bases at Rota and Morón to mark the 60th anniversary of the agreement under which they were established.

In July 2016, President Obama was the first sitting president to visit Spain in 15 years. Ambassador Costos accompanied President Obama, the first U.S. president to visit Naval Station Rota, where Costos oversaw the arrival of four U.S. Navy destroyers based there, as part of a NATO anti-missile defense shield.  

In his speech at Rota, President Obama said, "Spain is a strong NATO ally, we’re grateful for Spain’s many decades of hosting U.S. forces, and we’re major trading partners. That’s why the United States is deeply committed to maintaining our relationship with a strong, unified Spain. We need Spain’s continued contributions to the campaign against ISIL, to counter-terrorism efforts that prevent attacks and to NATO efforts that enhance our defense and deterrence posture. We need a growing Spanish economy to help sustain trade, growth in the EU and entrepreneurship so that globalization is creating jobs and opportunity for all people, not just a few at the top.” 

Building on the policy objectives of President Obama to promote global entrepreneurship, Ambassador Costos created and launched an event called InCubed (IN3) in June 2015, where innovators, investors and institutions would meet to network and exchange ideas. “You said you wanted access to Silicon Valley,” Costos told them. “Well, I have brought Silicon Valley to you."

In October 2013 the Spanish government summoned him to address allegations that the National Security Agency had recently collected data on 60 million telephone calls in Spain.

While visiting California in 2014, President Obama and his wife Michelle stayed at the Costos-Smith home.

In June 2015, he joined other gay U.S. ambassadors in a statement supporting international trade agreements, linking open markets to the development of open societies that provide civil rights protections.

In February 2017, Ambassador Costos joined the Board of Directors of PJT Partners, an advisory-focused investment bank. Paul J. Taubman is the Chairman and CEO of PJT Partners. Mr. Taubman founded PJT Partners in early 2013 and, in October 2014, announced the intention to merge into the spun-off Blackstone advisory businesses.

In April 2020, during the COVID-19 pandemic, Spain’s Grupo Secuoya, owner of the Madrid studios used by Netflix for its first European Production Hub, named Ambassador Costos, former HBO Executive, as president of Secuoya Studios, its TV fiction-film content production arm.

Costos was appointed in October 2020, to the board of the directors of Grifols S.A., a Spanish global biotherapeutics company listed on the IBEX 35. Grifols employs 24,000 people and had revenues of 5.1 billion euros in 2019, which grew by 13.6%, while net profit increased by 4.8% to 625 million euros.    

Grifols began Phase 3 clinical trials in patients with COVID-19 with its therapeutic manufactured in Clayton, North Carolina. Grifols is manufacturing the experimental therapy from the plasma of healthy, recovered COVID-19 patients, and was first to deploy a large-scale collection of this plasma, as well as the first to manufacture and deliver the clinical anti-SARS-CoV-2 hyperimmune globulin. 

In October 2021, Costos was appointed to the Human Rights Campaign Board of Directors and the HRC Foundation Board of Directors.  When Costos was appointed U.S. Ambassador in 2013, the Human Rights Campaign said "Costos is a true citizen of the world, he has incredible global business experience and is a respected and innovative leader. He has solid business and political relationships at the highest levels and a proven commitment to community, philanthropy, human rights, and democracy that make him an outstanding choice to be the nation's next Ambassador to Spain.” 

President Biden, in June 2022, appointed Costos to the J. William Fulbright Foreign Scholarship Board, an “educational and cultural exchange” network that connects students and professionals to international graduate and study programs. Costos said, “It’s a great privilege to continue the work I did when I was at the embassy, I always wanted to spend a lot of my time with the next generation of folks who are coming up behind us, because they will be our future leaders, and we have to invest our time and our resources in them."

Political positions
Costos characterized President Trump's handling of COVID-19 as a complete failure, "my country failed the world in this effort by not being adequately prepared for the pandemic and by recklessly refusing to take the lead on a coordinated global response." He insists that "competent leadership and a firm reliance on science is required to take the necessary actions to save our planet for future generations to come. Science and research are not fake news."

Costos explained, "We must work to restore trust in our leadership and join together to solve our world problems. Electing former Vice-President Joe Biden to the White House in November is the fundamental first step Americans should take to heal the soul and spirit of our nation, with the concomitant goal of immediately refocusing our nation’s global agenda."

Personal life
Costos lives in Los Angeles, California, with his partner Michael S. Smith, the official interior designer for the Obama White House. He is a vegetarian, but imposed no dietary restrictions on embassy functions. On the subject of LGBT rights, Costos has said "I am not an activist. I broadly support human rights for straight, gay, women’s issues. And I just happen to be gay.... This doesn't define me as a person, but it is part of who I am. It's like being a vegetarian: it's one more facet of James Costos." He said he and Smith had been welcomed in Spain "with great accommodation" and that because Spain already provides LGBT civil rights, the role he and Smith played was a symbolic for those who still suffered from a lack of enforcement in support of their rights: "What we can do through our messaging is give a sense of hope."

After leaving the White House in January 2017, the Obamas departed Washington for Palm Springs, where they were guests in the Costos-Smith home for several days before traveling to the British Virgin Islands to stay at the home of Sir Richard Branson.

See also

List of LGBT ambassadors of the United States

References

Additional sources

 Architectural Digest

External links 
 U.S. Embassy Madrid
 Ambassador Costos' Blog on ElMundo.es

|-

1963 births
Ambassadors of the United States to Andorra
Ambassadors of the United States to Spain
Gay diplomats
Living people
People from Lowell, Massachusetts
University of Massachusetts Lowell alumni
LGBT ambassadors of the United States
LGBT people from Massachusetts
21st-century American diplomats